Johann Heinrich Jakob Roth (also Franz Heinrich) (31 March 1729 – 19 October 1780) was a German master builder of the 18th century.

Life 
Born in Bad Mergentheim, he was the son of the court architect Franz Joseph Roth from Cologne. He worked mainly on buildings of the German Order, such as Mergentheim Palace. He also learned the basics of architecture from his father. Elector Clemens August of Bavaria supported him. This enabled him to continue his education in Paris. In 1754, he became a master builder and in 1759 a court chamber councillor.

Even before he was a regular master builder, he accompanied the Elector and Grand Master to Mergentheim in 1750. There he built a provisional wooden comedy and opera house in the castle courtyard. He created the stucco work in the Salle de gardes in the Augustusburg and Falkenlust Palaces, Brühl in 1754. A major work is the late Baroque . Around 1775 he worked as an advisor on the extension of the Residenzschloss in Münster. At about the same time, he rebuilt  in Meckenheim into a castle. Then, in 1779, he still created the Electoral Palace, Bonn.

Work

Further reading 
 
 Deutsche Biographische Enzyklopädie, Volume 8, Munich 2007, .

References 

German Baroque architects
1729 births
1780 deaths
People from Bad Mergentheim